Pedicularis dasyantha, the woolly lousewort or arctic hairy lousewort, is a plant native to the high arctic areas of Svalbard, Novaya Zemlya and the bordering mainland, and the western Taymyr Peninsula. In Svalbard it is restricted to the main island, Spitsbergen.

It grows to 10–15 cm tall, with a stout stem, single or a few together, from a thick, yellow taproot. The basal leaves are numerous and pinnately divided into many remote segments. The stem has many leaves, woolly in the uppermost part between the flowers. The flowers are produced in a dense oblong inflorescence, each flower with a red corolla, with the upper tip hairy; the corolla tube is longer than the calyx.

It grows in moist places and on heaths, often together with Dryas octopetala and Cassiope tetragona. Like all Pedicularis it is a hemiparasite and the preferred host is probably Dryas octopetala.

References

The Flora of Svalbard - Pedicularis dasyantha (Trautv.) Hadac
Pedicularis dasyantha in Panarctic Flora

dasyantha
Flora of the Arctic
Flora of Norway
Flora of Siberia
Flora of Russia
Novaya Zemlya